Juan José Francisco de Sámano y Uribarri de Rebollar y Mazorra (1753 in Selaya, Cantabria – July 1821 in Panama), was a Spanish military officer and viceroy of New Granada from 1818 to 1819, during the war of independence.

Military career
Sámano was a member of a distinguished family with a long tradition in the militia. In 1771 he entered the military as a cadet, and by 1779 he was a lieutenant. He was also a professor of mathematics at the Military Academy of Barcelona, where he remained five years.

In 1780 he moved to the Indies — first to Puerto Rico, later to Cuba, and finally to Cartagena de Indias (in modern Colombia). In 1785 he returned to Europe. In 1789 he was promoted to captain and fought in the war with revolutionary France, under the command of General Ventura Caro. In one battle he was wounded in both thighs.

In 1794 he was transferred back to New Granada, at his request. He became governor of Riohacha in 1806, where he repelled a British attack. From Riohacha he went to Bogotá, accompanied by 30 cavalry troops. There he volunteered for the service of Viceroy Antonio José Amar y Borbón to fight against the insurgents.

As a colonel, Sámano was in command of the Auxiliar Battalion in Bogotá at the time of the Florero de Llorente (Cry of Independence) on July 20, 1810. His second in command was José María Moledo, who together with other officers not only sympathized with the revolution, but took an active part in it. That night Sámano remained in his quarters, guarded by Moledo and Baraya, who had sworn allegiance to the rebel junta in Bogotá. In the early morning of July 21, Colonel Sámano took an oath before the president of the Junta, José Miguel Pey. Pey ordered that he be relieved of his command of the Auxliar Battalion. Lieutenant Colonel Moledo was named to replace him.

Sámano was issued a passport so that he could leave New Granada. He returned to Spain, where he was commissioned to pacify the region of Quito and Guayaquil. From Quito he directed the military operations against the rebels in New Granada. In 1813 he was named by Governor Toribio Montes to lead an expedition to recover the southern part of the Viceroyalty of New Granada. He got as far as the city of Popayán, which he occupied on July 1, 1813. There he proclaimed the authority of the Constitution of Cádiz. He was promoted to brigadier.

Sámano was defeated by Antonio Nariño in the Battle of Alto Palacé on December 30, 1813, and again in the Battle of Calibío on January 15, 1814. He fled with a reduced group of soldiers to Pasto. There he was replaced by Field Marshal Melchor Aymerich, because, according to Governor Toribio Montes, though Sámano was loyal to the Crown and had much military experience, more audacious tactics were needed for a royalist victory.

He returned to Quito, where he was given command of another expedition to New Granada. His command in Pasto was restored, and on June 29, 1816, he won a decisive victory at Cuchilla del Tambo over the rebel Liborio Mejía. Two hundred fifty were killed, and the Royalists took 300 prisoners and all of the rebels' arms and equipment.

On July 1, 1816, Sámano's troops again occupied Popayán. Among the patriots taken prisoner was José Hilario López, who unexpectedly escaped execution and later became president of New Granada (1849–53). Sámano ordered the execution of rebel leader Carlos Montúfar.

After promoting him to field marshal, Morillo gave Sámano command of Bogotá as commanding general of New Granada. He arrived in Bogotá on October 23, 1816, where he began a program of repression without the approval of Viceroy Francisco Montalvo y Ambulodi. He founded three tribunals: the Permanent Council of War, empowered to issue death sentences against the rebels; the Council of Purification, authorized to judge rebels not meriting the death penalty; and the Junta of Confiscation, intended to seize the possessions of others compromised in the rebellion.

Among the rebels executed were Camilo Torres, Francisco José de Caldas, Joaquín Camacho, Frutos Joaquín Gutiérrez, Antonio Villavicencio, Antonio Baraya, Liborio Mejía, Jorge Tadeo Lozano, Policarpa Salavarrieta, Alejo Sabaraín, and María Antonia Santos Plata.

As viceroy
In August 1817 Sámano was named viceroy, governor and captain general of the reborn Viceroyalty of New Granada, and president of the Audiencia of Bogotá. By royal decree he was granted the Grand Cross of the Order of San Hermenegildo, for his services to the Crown. He took formal possession of his new offices on March 9, 1818. He founded the Academy of Medicine in Bogotá. However, the Audiencia formally complained of his administration to Madrid.

On August 9, 1819, news of the defeat of José Barreiro forces in the Battle of Boyacá arrived in the capital. Sámano quickly fled to Cartagena de Indias, where they refused to recognize his authority. (He was unpopular there because of his reputation for repression.)

He sailed for Jamaica, but soon returned to Panama. He remained there without administrative or military control until his resignation. In August 1819, old and sick, he resigned as viceroy. He remained in Panama until his death in July 1821, awaiting permission to return to Spain.

References

 This article is a free translation of the article Juan de Sámano in the Spanish Wikipedia, version of February 12, 2007.
 Negret, R., "Don Juan Sámano. De su hoja de servicios". Boletín de Historia y Antigüedades, Vol. XIII, N-°s 150 y 151 (agosto y septiembre de 1920), pp. 367–370.
 Lozano Cleves, Alberto, Así se formó la Independencia, 2 vols. Bogotá: Editorial Iris, 1961.
 Mercado, Jorge, La campaña invasión de Moritlo. Bogotá: Talleres del Estado Mayor, 1919.
 Riaño, Camilo. La Campaña Libertadora de 1819. Bogotá: Editorial Andes, 1969.

External links
 Short biography at Biblioteca Luis Ángel Arango

1753 births
1821 deaths
Viceroys of New Granada
Spanish generals